The Swan Lake Rock House Historic District is a historic district listed on the National Register of Historic Places located southeast of Boulder, Montana.  It was added to the Register on August 1, 1984.  It includes Evans' Rock House.  It is located on what is known as Three Rock Point on the western side of Swan Lake in Lake County, Montana.

It includes five contributing buildings built in 1930.

It is related to the Kootenai Lodge Historic District.

References

Houses on the National Register of Historic Places in Montana
Houses in Lake County, Montana
Historic districts on the National Register of Historic Places in Montana
National Register of Historic Places in Lake County, Montana
Houses completed in 1930